Near Eastern archaeology is a regional branch of the wider, global discipline of archaeology. It refers generally to the excavation and study of artifacts and material culture of the Near East from antiquity to the recent past.

Definition
The description "Near Eastern" for this branch of archaeology is highly Eurocentric and Americocentric, reflecting the origins and growth of the field in Western academic traditions. However, in the absence of better solutions, and the continued heavy involvement of Western academics, the term has taken hold and remains in frequent use.

The definition of the Near East is usually based on the Fertile Crescent; the region between the Nile Valley (modern Egypt) and Mesopotamia (modern Iraq). Also usually included are Iran, the Arabian peninsula and its islands, Anatolia (modern-day Turkey), Cyprus and North Africa west of Egypt. The history of archaeological investigation in this region grew out of the 19th century discipline of Biblical archaeology, efforts mostly by Europeans to uncover evidence for Biblical (Old and New Testaments) narratives. Much archaeological work in this region is still influenced by that discipline, although within the last three decades there has been a marked tendency by some archaeologists to dissociate their work from Biblical frameworks.

Near Eastern Archaeology is a term with a wide, often generalised application, and is frequently divided into further regional sub-branches, the archaeology of modern states in the region or along broad thematic lines. Regions can be loosely defined, but are often based on recognizable entities that evidence cultural cohesion and coincide with topographical zones. Scholars may differ on the way the region is divided. Regional divisions also may change from period to period.

The most common fields of study are Biblical archaeology dealing with the region and history of the Bible; Assyriology dealing with Mesopotamia; Egyptology dealing with the ancient history of what is today Egypt and parts of the Sudan; and prehistoric archaeology which is not tied to a region but instead deals with the origins of culture before the invention of writing.

Geographic subdivisions

Egypt
Egyptology is one example of a specialized branch that deals with the Nile Valley cultures of Egypt and associated regions in sub-Saharan Africa, the Sinai Peninsula to the east, and parts of North Africa. It includes language studies, history and archaeology and their related disciplines. Nowadays, there is much work also done on the prehistoric archaeological record and its practitioners are best described as prehistorians.

Southern Levant/Syria-Palestine
The name Levant (or Syria-Palestine) is used to refer to the area adjacent to the east coast of the Mediterranean. The southern region included in this term encompasses Israel, the West Bank, Gaza Strip, and part of Jordan. Palestine was its ancient Roman and Byzantine name and was also in use during the Crusades (1095–1291), the period of Ottoman rule (1517-1917) and the British Mandate (1918–1948). The same region is also called the Holy Land, the Land of Israel, and Canaan because of biblical associations. The foregoing names can be perceived as having political overtones, meaning that the more neutral, geographically based term the southern Levant has become popular with archaeologists who wish to refer to this area without prejudice or political orientation.  In many contexts the Sinai Peninsula is also considered to be part of the southern Levant, although it is part of the modern state of Egypt. Archaeologically, it is distinguished from the heartland of Egypt, the Nile Valley and Delta.

Northern Levant
The term northern Levant can be used to refer to Lebanon, the Syrian littoral and portions of the Mediterranean coast of Turkey in the province of Hatay. More usually,  these regions are included in greater Syria, a name used to refer to the whole area between Anatolia, Mesopotamia and Arabia. The Mediterranean coast of Lebanon, the Syrian Arab Republic and parts of Northern Israel are also known as Phoenicia, after the ancient kingdom. However, this term suffers from the same problems as Canaan and equivalents and so is generally now only used in a strict historical sense.

Anatolia
The landmass of Anatolia, most of modern Turkey, is bordered by several seas and includes parts of Northern Mesopotamia. The Tigris and Euphrates rise in Turkey and flow south into Iraq.

Cyprus
Cyprus (ancient Alashiya), a large island in the eastern Mediterranean was a separate cultural entity during most periods of human occupation. However, its proximity to both Anatolia and the northern and southern Levant was responsible for influences from and to both these regions. This was especially the case as Cyprus was an important source of copper for much of the region.

Mesopotamia
Mesopotamia ("The Land of Two Rivers") is considered to begin more or less near the modern border with Iraq and refers to the flat valley of the southern Tigris and Euphrates rivers and their tributaries. These rivers empty into the Shatt al-Arab waterway that separates Iraq from Iran. Sumerology is a very specialized discipline that deals with the history, language and archaeology of ancient Sumer (southern Mesopotamia), mostly during the 4th and 3rd millennium BCE. Assyriology deals with the Assyrians who succeeded the Sumerians and covers much of the region while that language was still in use.

Iran/Persia
Iran, sometimes known as Persia, includes a large plateau and its periphery, including the Zagros Mountains. Sub-disciplines of this region deal mostly with the languages, history and archaeology of regions within this large area.

Arabian Peninsula
The Arabian Peninsula and its offshore islands is a separate geographical zone that has contacts with Sinai, the well-watered regions to the north, and by sea with the far-east.

Organisations

Due to the historic interest in the archaeology of the Near East, especially due to the Biblical links of the area, there are a large number of organisations dedicated to the archaeological investigation of the region. These include the American Schools of Oriental Research which publishes the journal Near Eastern Archaeology Magazine, the Council for British Research in the Levant which publishes the journal Levant, and The Netherlands Institute for the Near East which publishes the journal Bibliotheca Orientalis.

See also
Assyriology
List of Assyriologists
Levantine archaeology
Genetic history of the Middle East
Near Eastern Archaeology
Near Eastern bioarchaeology
ICAANE (International Congress on the Archaeology of the Ancient Near East)

External links
Ancient Near East .net
ETANA
Introduction to Biblical Archaeology (2005)
Resources on Biblical Archaeology
Pottery types of the Levant
Jerusalem: The Circuit of the Walls
Bioarchaeology of the Near East

 
Archaeological sub-disciplines
Ancient Near East